Roba may refer to:
Roba (TV series), a Finnish television series
 Jean Roba (1930–2006), a Belgian comics author best known for the popular comic Boule et Bill
Roba Stanley (1908–1986), early American female country music recording artist
 a character from the American animated television series The Problem Solverz
 Espa Roba, a Yu-Gi-Oh! character

Ethiopian name
Roba (Amharic: ሮባ) is a male given name of Ethiopian origin that may refer to:

Roba Gari (born 1982), Ethiopian steeplechase runner
Alemayehu Roba (born 1972), retired Ethiopian male middle-distance runner
Fatuma Roba (born 1973), Ethiopian female marathon runner and 1996 Olympic champion

Ethiopian given names
Amharic-language names